The Mount Pleasant micropolitan area may refer to:

The Mount Pleasant, Michigan micropolitan area, United States
The Mount Pleasant, Texas micropolitan area, United States

See also
Mount Pleasant (disambiguation)